The 1969–70 NHL season was the 53rd season of the National Hockey League. For the third straight season, the St. Louis Blues reached the Stanley Cup finals, and for the third straight year, the winners of the expansion West Division were swept four games to none. This time, however, it was at the hands of the Boston Bruins, as the defending champions Montreal Canadiens narrowly missed the playoffs, something that did not happen again for the next quarter century. With both the Canadiens and Toronto Maple Leafs missing the 1970 Stanley Cup playoffs, it was the first time in league history that no Canadian team in the NHL (two Canadian teams at the time) qualified for the playoffs (something that has happened only once since, in 2016, when all seven NHL's Canadian teams missed the playoffs). It was also the final season that teams wore their colored jerseys at home until the 2003–04 season.

Regular season
Bobby Orr of the Boston Bruins became the first (and as of 2022, the only) defenceman in NHL history to win the league scoring championship. He did it by setting a new record for assists with 87 and totalling 120 points, only six shy of the point record set the previous season by teammate Phil Esposito. Along the way, he also won the Norris Trophy for the third straight year as the top defenceman, the Hart Trophy for league MVP, and the Conn Smythe Trophy for the playoff MVP, being the only player in the NHL to win four individual awards in a single season.

Gordie Howe finished the season within the ten leading NHL point scorers for an all-time record of 21 consecutive seasons; it was the final season he did so.

For the second straight season, the St. Louis Blues easily won the West Division, being the only team in the division to have a winning record.

The East Division, however, saw a temporary changing of the guard, as Montreal dropped from first the previous season to fifth, missing the playoffs on the total goals scored tie-breaker with the New York Rangers. The Rangers were in first place for a time, but injuries on the blueline doomed any hope of a first-place finish, and they even obtained Tim Horton in desperation. It was the only season Montreal failed to make the playoffs between 1948 and 1995, and as the Toronto Maple Leafs also failed to make the postseason, this was the first playoffs in NHL history to feature no Canadian teams. These developments were instrumental in the decision to move Chicago to the West Division in conjunction with the 1970 expansion, and the adoption of "crossover" playoff series between East and West Division teams the following season. The division crossover kept the newer expansion teams out of the Stanley Cup final for the next three seasons. The Bruins and the Black Hawks both tied for the lead in the East (and entire league) with 99 points, but Chicago was awarded first place because they had 5 more wins. It was Chicago's second first-place finish in team history (the first being 1966–67).

Canadiens/Rangers tiebreaker
The last two playoff berths in the East Division were contested by three teams entering the final weekend of the season. The Detroit Red Wings were in third place with 93 points, followed by the Montreal Canadiens with 92 and the New York Rangers with 90. The Red Wings captured the third seed with a 6–2 win over the Rangers on Saturday night. The Canadiens needed just one victory to clinch the fourth and final berth. A New York win and a Montreal loss in their final games would give each team identical 38–22–16 records. At that time, the next tiebreaker was goals scored, in which the Canadiens held a 242–237 advantage. The Rangers also had to outscore the Canadiens by at least five goals in order to qualify for the postseason. The Rangers peppered Red Wings goaltender Crozier with a franchise-record 65 shots on goal en route to a 9–5 triumph and a four-goal lead over Montreal.

Later that evening, the Canadiens either had to win, or score at least five goals in defeat, but were up against a Black Hawks team needing a victory to clinch top seed in the divisional playoffs. With Montreal trailing 5–2 and desperate for three more goals with 9:16 remaining in the third period, coach Claude Ruel pulled netminder Rogie Vachon for an extra attacker. Instead, the Canadiens surrendered five empty-net goals in a 10–2 defeat and missed the postseason for the only time within a 46-season span from 1949 to 1994. Montreal's Yvan Cournoyer commented on the Red Wings' effort in the afternoon, bitterly stating, "Those guys have no pride."

Final standings

Playoffs

Playoff bracket

Quarterfinals

(E1) Chicago Black Hawks vs. (E3) Detroit Red Wings

The Chicago Black Hawks finished as the NHL's best regular season team with 99 points. Detroit finished third in the East Division with 95 points. This was the ninth playoff meeting between these two teams, and they split their eight previous meetings. They last met in the 1966 semifinals which Detroit won in six games. These teams each won four games of their eight-game regular season series.

In the Chicago-Detroit series, the Black Hawks swept the series, winning all four games by 4–2 scores.

(E2) Boston Bruins vs. (E4) New York Rangers

The Boston Bruins finished second in the East Division, earning 99 points. The New York Rangers earned 95 points to finish fourth in the East. This was the seventh playoff meeting between these two teams, with Boston winning four of their six previous meetings. They last met in the 1958 semifinals which Boston won in six games. These teams each won four games of their eight-game regular season series.

The Bruins clobbered the Rangers 8–2 in game one; Ranger coach Emile Francis replaced Ed Giacomin when the score reached 7–1, in favor of Terry Sawchuk. Sawchuk replaced Giacomin as the starter in game two, but Boston won 5–3.

Game three at Madison Square Garden featured a hostile crowd, with the New York fans booing, shouting obscenities and throwing objects at the Boston players. Giacomin – back in goal for the Rangers – reportedly told Bruin Derek Sanderson "We're being paid to get you tonight."  A subsequent brawl erupted into both benches clearing, as well as fans littering the ice with debris; it took 19 minutes to play the first 91 seconds of the game. By the end of the Rangers' 4–3 win, the teams had set a new NHL playoff record for penalties (38) and penalty minutes (174).

Game four had Rod Gilbert score two goals in a 4–2 Ranger win. Giacomin was brilliant in goal for the Rangers and one of the highlights was stopping Derek Sanderson on a shorthanded breakaway. Game five was won by Boston 3–2 as Esposito scored two goals. Bobby Orr set up the winner when he stole a pass at center ice when the Rangers were caught on a line change. Game six was won easily by the Bruins and featured another display of fan abuse. Bobby Orr scored two goals, including the winner. Fans threw eggs and ball bearings on the ice, and when the outcome was no longer in doubt, set fires in the mezzanine of Madison Square Garden.

(W1) St. Louis Blues vs. (W3) Minnesota North Stars

The St. Louis Blues finished first in the West Division with 86 points. The Minnesota North Stars earned 60 points to finish third in the West. This was the second playoff meeting between these two teams. Their only previous meeting was in the 1968 semi-finals which St. Louis won in seven games. St. Louis won this year's eight-game regular season series, earning ten of sixteen points.

The St. Louis Blues ousted the Minnesota North Stars in six games. The Blues won the first two games at the St. Louis Arena. Game three at the Metropolitan Sports Center featured Gump Worsley's sharp goaltending and Bill Goldsworthy scoring two goals in a 4–2 win for the North Stars. Cesare Maniago played in goal for Minnesota in game four and picked up a 4–0 shutout, tying the series. Game five at St. Louis Arena was tied 3–3 when St Louis scored three goals in the third period by Red Berenson, Terry Gray and Jim Roberts and the Blues won 6–3. In game six, Ab McDonald scored two goals as the Blues eliminated the North Stars by a score of 4–2.

(W2) Pittsburgh Penguins vs. (W4) Oakland Seals

Pittsburgh finished second in the West Division, earning 64 points. Oakland earned 58 points to finish fourth in the West. This was the first and only series between these two teams. Oakland won this year's eight-game regular season series, earning nine of sixteen points.

In game one, Nick Harbaruk's goal midway through the third period was the winner as Pittsburgh won 2–1. In game two, Gary Jarrett gave Oakland a 1–0 lead, but Pittsburgh came back to win 3–1. Game three at Oakland featured a hat trick by Ken Schinkel of the Penguins as Pittsburgh won 5–2. Game four saw Oakland holding 1–0 and 2–1 leads, but the Seals just couldn't hold on and the game was tied 2–2 at the end of regulation time, with Michel Briere scoring the series winning goal at 8:28 of overtime for Pittsburgh. It was the final time the Seals made the playoffs. The Stanley Cup Playoffs did not return to the Bay Area until 1994 when the San Jose Sharks made the playoffs for the first time. This also marks only the second of three times ever a team in any of the four North American major sports have swept a team in their first playoff series.

Semifinals

(E1) Chicago Black Hawks vs. (E2) Boston Bruins

This was the third meeting between these two teams with Boston winning both of their meetings. They last met in the 1942 quarter-finals where Boston won the best-of-three series in three games. These two teams split their eight-game regular season series, each earning eight points.

Boston beat Chicago in four straight games to win the East Division final for the first time.

(W1) St. Louis Blues vs. (W2) Pittsburgh Penguins

This was the first playoff meeting between these two teams. St. Louis won this year's eight-game regular season series, earning twelve of sixteen points.

The St. Louis Blues beat the Pittsburgh Penguins in six games to have won every West Division Final, as there were no Division Finals the following season. The Pens did not get to the semifinals again until their championship season in 1991.

Stanley Cup Finals

This was the first playoff meeting between these two teams. This was St. Louis' third Stanley Cup Final, having advanced to the round every season since entering the league. In both of their previous appearances, they lost to the Montreal Canadiens in four games. This was Boston's eleventh Stanley Cup Finals appearance, having won the championship three times previously. They last advanced to the Finals in 1958 where they lost to Montreal in six games. Boston won this year's six-game regular season series, earning eight of twelve points.

Phil Esposito of the Bruins led all playoff scorers with 13 goals and 14 assists for 27 points, at the time a new NHL playoff record, followed by Orr with 20 points and Johnny Bucyk of the Bruins with 19 points. Gerry Cheevers of the Bruins led all goaltenders with twelve wins, while Jacques Plante of the Blues led all goaltenders in goals against average in the playoffs with 1.48.

Awards

All-Star teams

Player statistics

Scoring leaders
Note: GP = Games Played, G = Goals, A = Assists, Pts = Points

Source: NHL.

Leading goaltenders
Note: GP = Games played; Min = Minutes played; GA = Goals against; GAA = Goals against average; W = Wins; L = Losses; T = Ties; SO = Shutouts

Other statistics
 Plus-Minus leader:  Bobby Orr, Boston Bruins

Coaches

East
Boston Bruins: Harry Sinden
Chicago Black Hawks: Billy Reay
Detroit Red Wings: Bill Gadsby and Sid Abel
Montreal Canadiens: Claude Ruel
New York Rangers: Emile Francis
Toronto Maple Leafs: John McLellan

West
Los Angeles Kings: Hal Laycoe and Larry Regan
Minnesota North Stars: Wren Blair and Charlie Burns
Oakland Seals: Fred Glover
Philadelphia Flyers: Vic Stasiuk
Pittsburgh Penguins: Red Kelly
St. Louis Blues: Scotty Bowman

Debuts
The following is a list of players of note who played their first NHL game in 1969–70 (listed with their first team, asterisk(*) marks debut in playoffs):
Keith Magnuson, Chicago Black Hawks
Butch Goring, Los Angeles Kings
Gilles Gilbert, Minnesota North Stars
Guy Charron, Montreal Canadiens
Marc Tardif, Montreal Canadiens
Rejean Houle, Montreal Canadiens
Don Luce, New York Rangers
Bobby Clarke, Philadelphia Flyers

Last games
The following is a list of players of note that played their last game in the NHL in 1969–70 (listed with their last team):
Ron Murphy, Boston Bruins
Leo Boivin, Minnesota North Stars
Moose Vasko, Minnesota North Stars
Claude Provost, Montreal Canadiens
Terry Sawchuk, New York Rangers
Camille Henry, St. Louis Blues
Johnny Bower, Toronto Maple Leafs
Marcel Pronovost, Toronto Maple Leafs

See also
 List of Stanley Cup champions
 1969 NHL Amateur Draft
 1969–70 NHL transactions
 23rd National Hockey League All-Star Game
 National Hockey League All-Star Game
 1969 in sports
 1970 in sports

References
 
 
 
 
 

Notes

External links
Hockey Database
NHL.com
hickoksports.com

 
1969–70 in American ice hockey by league
1969–70 in Canadian ice hockey by league